Julia Dittrich, geborene Wilhelm, (born 10 July 1980) is a German writer and journalist.

Life
Wilhelm was born and raised in Zweibrücken. She studied English literature and Cultural anthropology at the University of Mainz. In 2004, she spent a year teaching, studying and researching at the University of Iceland and Bristol University.

Since 2000, Wilhelm has published numerous articles and reviews for the local newspaper Die Rheinpfalz, the internet presence of the German television network 3sat and various magazines.

In 2014 Dittrich (by then still named Wilhelm) became head of the Kreisvolkshochschule Südpfalz.

She got married in 2016.

Writing career
Wilhelm's area of expertise is Jane Austen and her influence on Chick Lit, the genre of women's literature which emerged after the publication of Bridget Jones's Diary by Helen Fielding in 1996. Her first book, Appropriations of Jane Austen's Pride and Prejudice in Contemporary British Fiction, was published in 2006.

Bibliography
 Representing the Troubles: Mary Beckett's A Belfast Woman (2003)
 Appropriations of Jane Austen’s Pride and Prejudice in Contemporary British Fiction (2006)
 The Mother of Chick Lit?! Jane Austen's Use in Contemporary British Fiction (2011)

References

External links
 Wilhelm's Bio
 Appropriations of Jane Austen’s Pride and Prejudice in Contemporary British Fiction

Living people
German women writers
1980 births